The Garnet Rocks are a group of three rocks lying  east of the Refuge Islands in the northern part of Rymill Bay, off the west coast of Graham Land, Antarctica. They were first surveyed in 1948–49 by the Falkland Islands Dependencies Survey and so named by them because of the occurrence of garnet in the rocks.

References

Rock formations of Graham Land
Fallières Coast